Not to be confused American military officer and Mississippi Supreme Court judge Jonathan Tarbell

John M. Tarbell is an American engineer, currently a CUNY and Wallace Coulter Distinguished Professor at City College of New York.

References

Year of birth missing (living people)
Living people
City College of New York faculty
21st-century American engineers
Rutgers University alumni
University of Delaware alumni